Mobile Suit Gundam: Gundam vs. Zeta Gundam, known in Japan as , is a PS2 and GameCube arcade third-person shooter. The game takes place seven years after the One Year War Gundam storyline. The game features 31 mobile suits which can be played in five different modes. These modes are arcade, versus, universal century mode, survival, and training.

Synopsis

The game takes place within the continuity of Mobile Suit Gundam, Mobile Suit Zeta Gundam, and Mobile Suit Gundam ZZ. Although the overall environment that the arcade mode is placed in is set seven years after the one-year war that took place during the first major entry. In the game, the player can play through several game modes that will allow access to unlock characters, weapons, artwork and more. It is even possible to unlock Gundam suits from Gundam SEED (despite the fact Mobile Suit Gundam SEED does not take place in the universal century continuity).

Development
The time of the production's start date is unknown. It is possible it could have been close to a year in between the release of its arcade counterpart, which would have been 2004. Although there is no official ties to the game, nor its developers. The possible prequel to this game in terms of story and setting is Mobile Suit Gundam: Federation vs. Zeon as the campaign mode takes place closer to the storyline of the first Mobile Suit Gundam entry. It is also likely that the game was developed on the third generation of the unreal engine given Bandai history with that system and the time period it was released.

It is also noted that the release of this game on the Nintendo Gamecube was only available in Japan.

Gameplay

Arcade Mode
This allows players to choose between either the team up of the E.F.S.F and A.E.U.G, or the Titans and Zeons. Once done, the player will have the option to choose their own difficulty within the mode. The player must choose both a ground unit and a space unit for combat. They may also choose which weapons they want to customize for their characters. The player will then be put through a gauntlet of matches against computer control in which they have to fight. This mode is also two player, which can either be used to co-op or play against each other.

Versus
Versus mode is quite similar to the one on one option on arcade mode, except that there is only one match rather than a gauntlet of matches.

Survival Mode
Survival Mode allows player to battle an endless gauntlet of CPU players. Unlike in the arcade mode, the player will not recover health from matches. The player continues to fight until they have been defeated.

Training
This is the standard training mode for players that want to learn and experience the controls and gameplay as well as experiment with suit and weapon combinations without consequence.

Universal Century Mode
The Universal Century mode is at its core the campaign mode of the game. This allows the player to pick between three forces, The A.E.U.G, The Titans, and The Axis. Each team is its own storyline that the player can play through. They all take place within the One Year War timeline that the First three Mobile Suit Gundam series revolve around.

Playable Character Roster

( There are some characters that are pallet swaps of the same pilot)

Reception

The PlayStation 2 version received "mixed" reviews according to the review aggregation website Metacritic. In Japan, however, Famitsu gave it a score of 33 out of 40 for the PS2 version, and 32 out of 40 for the GameCube version.

The game was praised for the number of available playable mobile suits and the number of different modes of play. However, it was criticized for the bland background, poor controls, low frame rates and a nonadjustable camera angle.

References

External links
 

2004 video games
Bandai games
Capcom games
GameCube games
Gundam video games
PlayStation 2 games
Third-person shooters
Video games developed in Japan